Encounter Books is a book publisher in the United States known for publishing conservative authors. It was named for Encounter, the now defunct literary magazine founded by Irving Kristol and Stephen Spender.

Based in New York City since 2006, Encounter Books publishes non-fiction books in the areas of politics, history, religion, biography, education, public policy, current affairs and social sciences.

History
Encounter Books was founded in 1998 in San Francisco by the Bradley Foundation, with Peter Collier as editor. Collier retired in late-2005. Encounter Books was taken over by the commentator Roger Kimball, who is also co-editor and publisher of The New Criterion magazine. In early 2006, Kimball relocated Encounter Books to New York City.

Encounter was the publisher of When Harry Became Sally which was banned from Amazon in February 2021. In response, publisher Roger Kimball said in a statement, "Amazon is using its massive power to distort the marketplace of ideas and is deceiving its own customers in the process."

Commercial appeal
Several of its titles have sold sufficiently to appear on The New York Times Best Seller List, including Black Rednecks and White Liberals by Thomas Sowell, Climate Confusion by Roy W. Spencer, Willful Blindness by Andrew C. McCarthy, and The Grand Jihad, also by McCarthy.

Encounter Broadsides
In October 2009, Encounter launched a series of short polemical booklets in what it said was the spirit of The Federalist Papers and Thomas Paine's Common Sense. These are called Encounter Broadsides. The series publishes well-known commentators on topical political issues, from health care and immigration to the Guantanamo Bay detention camp. Published Broadside authors include John R. Bolton, Victor Davis Hanson, John Fund, Michael Ledeen, Andrew C. McCarthy, Betsy McCaughey, Stephen Moore, and Michael B. Mukasey. Publisher Roger Kimball said of the series:

Publishers Weekly reported that the Broadside series would be "crashed", meaning produced and marketed on an aggressive turnaround schedule.

Review policies
In June 2009, Encounter announced that it was no longer sending its books to The New York Times Book Review. At the time, publisher Roger Kimball complained that The New York Times was politicized and superficial in its cultural coverage. He said his books could not expect positive reviews from the Times and said they could gain "impetus" from "the pluralistic universe of talk radio and the 'blogosphere'." He said Encounter could have its books make the Times's bestseller list without having the newspaper review them.

References

External links 
 Encounter Books web site
 C-SPAN interview with editor Roger Kimball at the Conservative Political Action Conference

Publishing companies established in 1997
Political organizations based in the United States
Conservative media in the United States
Political book publishing companies